K41 may refer to:
 K-41 (Kansas highway)
 K41 (nightclub) in Kyiv, Ukraine
 , a corvette of the Royal Navy
 , a corvette of the Indian Navy
 Piano Concerto No. 4 (Mozart), by Wolfgang Amadeus Mozart
 Potassium-41, an isotope of potassium
 K41 (theory), Kolmogorov´s theory about turbulence